William Crassus I , aka Le Gros or Gras and Grace (died 1219), was the son of Stephen II Le Gros born 1112 second son of his  parents were Stephen I(Etienne)and wife daughter of Roger De Mortimer. William was from an Anglo-Norman baronial family long established in central Normandy. The house of Blois  (Capet and Robertian of Hugh. Odo the count of Champagne who married Adelaide of Normandy sister of William I the conqueror) He inherited Sodbury from his uncle, [[William le Gros, 1st Earl of Albemarle aka Guillaume le Gros (c. 1101 – 1179), Count of Aumale; married Cecily de Rumily of Skipton,[a] daughter of William fitz Duncan.]], primo-genitus. Brother of Stephen II - William was granted a licence to hold fairs and markets in (what is now) Chipping Sodbury in 1217.

William was appointed Seneschal of Normandy in 1203 by King John of England. He was a noted kinsman and follower of the elder William Marshal, 1st Earl of Pembroke.who now lies in the Round Temple Church London at the Inner Temple.

William Crassus exchanged with Wellands family his inherited lands in Chipping Sodbury for land in Kilkenny Ireland at CourtTown Tullerone where he built the Grace Courtstown Castle castle.  He was linked to the 'old English' families representative of the King and the Ormond/Butler family. 

The family whom the exchange of land were the Welland's who moved to Chipping Sodbury Gloucestershire on exchange.

The Kilkenny Tullerone Courtstown castle he built near Freshford on the river that runs through the farming lands 10 miles from Kilkenny This castle was raised to the ground by the Geraldine’s as Le Gros/Grace family took the English side with the Butler’s against Fitzgerald  and Desmond in the Geraldine rebellion wars 1579 in Kilkenny Ireland.

The remains of the castle is the outline of foundation line in blue stone in a farm field where it stood in Tullaroan Courtstown kilkenny. There is a plaque erected at the site of the castle marking the land of the castle which is owned by the farmer Mrs Holmes. The castle was built by primogenisis to the Grace family in Kilkenny -William Le Gros Crassus aka Grace son of Stephen II (Etienne) above.who inherited the manor of chipping Sodbury Gloucestershire from his uncle William Le Gros. Duke of Aumale. He followed William Marshal the Earl of Pembroke to Kilkenny Ireland. He was made Sheriff of Tipperary.

FAMILY
William Crassus aka le Gros/Grace Was the son of  Stephen II (Etienne) Le Gros (b:1112) and Hawise (mother) daughter of Roger de Mortimer, Lord of Wigmore and Seigneur de St. Victor-en-Caux, and Mélisende.  Their children were :

 Guillaume le Gros (c. 1101 – 1179), Count of Aumale; married Cecily of Skipton,[a] daughter of William fitz Duncan. Uncle to William Crassus.
 Étienne le Gros (Stephen II ), (born c. 1112) mentioned 1150; married the daughter of Roger Mortimer
 Enguerrand or Ingelran de Aumale, mentioned 1150
 Agnès (c. 1117 – after 1170), married William de Roumare († 1151), son of William de Roumare, Earl of Lincoln. As his widow she secondly married Adam I de Brus, Lord of Skelton.
William Crassus was the eldest son of Stephen II, Count of Aumale, and his spouse, Hawise, daughter of Roger de Mortimer of Wigmore. 

Stephen II’s father Stephen (Etienne) born ….Count of Aumale. He was the only son of Odo, Count of Champagne, house of Blois  and Adelaide of Normandy ((aka Adel/Adeliza) (c. 1030 – bef. 1090) was the ruling Countess of Aumale in her own right in 1069-1087.,on the death of her daughter Hawise from her first Marriage; Adelaide was sister of William I the Conqueror. 

Stephen II succeeded his elder brother William aka Guilliame (died without issue) 
Odo was the son of Stephen (II) of Troyes and Meaux, and married to Adelaide  aka Adelaide of Normandy sister to William the conqueror.  He was still a minor at the death of his father, and his uncle Theobald III of Blois acted as regent of Troyes.

In 1060, Odo married Adelaide of Normandy, daughter of Robert I, Duke of Normandy and widow of his second wife Enguerrand II, Count of Ponthieu, Lord of Aumale and second marriage to Lambert II, Count of Lens. After the death of Enguerrand's only daughter named Hawise from her first marriage - Adelaide, her mother Adelaide of Normandy became her heir and hence through his marriage to Adelaide Odo acquired the title Count (or Earl) of Aumale in Normandy Jure uxoris (by right of his wife).

Adelaide (sometime called Adele or Adeliza) was also sister of William the Conqueror, and Odo accompanied his brother-in-law in the Norman conquest of England (1066). At this time his cousin Theobald III of Blois then seized Odo's counties in the Champagne region France whilst he was in England., One version states William I, for his services in the conquest gave Odo Holderness in Yorkshire. Another proposes that the Lordship of Holderness was granted to William's sister Adelaide, in 1087, and Odo her husband became Earl of Holderness by right of his wife. Odo had one son with Adelaide: Stephen I, Count of Aumale (born: 1070 died 1127) who had three sons and a daughter.

William Crassus I married Margaret, daughter of Robert Fitz Warren. By Margaret he had at least one son, his namesake, William Crassus, or Le Gros. He moved his family to Kilkenny Ireland; was made the Sheriff of Tipperary Ireland.  He had three sons at Tullaroan the Grace’s Courtstown castle.

Confirmation by William le Cras, eldest son of William le Cras, with the assent of William le Cras the younger, Hamon le Cras and Anselm le Cras, treasurer of Exeter, his brothers, for the soul of Robert le Cras, his brother, at rest at Bradenstoke, of all the land of Wales, which he had given to Robert for his homage and service. The canons to hold from him and his heirs in alms. 
Warranty. They are to be quit of all services except that owed to the chief lord of the fee. Seal. Witnesses: Sir William Marshall, earl of Pembroke, William Marshall his son, William le Cras the younger, Hamon le Cras, Anselm le Cras treasurer of Exeter, brothers of the donor, Everard the German, Frank the German his brother, Alan son of Warin, William Bluet, John de Easton, William le Printz, Ralph de Hinton, Philip de Farley.

The castle was destroyed burnt to ground because William Crassus le Gros Grace went against the Geraldine’s war.

Aumale (English) and Albermale (French) are same.
It is said that most of the English families in Ireland eventually married local Irish girls going native.

References

Anglo-Normans

1219 deaths
Year of birth missing